The Gadsden Steel Makers were a Minor League Baseball team based in Gadsden, Alabama, that played in the Southeastern League and Georgia–Alabama League from 1910 to 1914.

External links
Baseball Reference

Baseball teams established in 1910
Baseball teams disestablished in 1914
Defunct minor league baseball teams
Professional baseball teams in Alabama
Defunct Georgia-Alabama League teams
Defunct Southeastern League teams
1910 establishments in Alabama
1914 disestablishments in Alabama
Defunct baseball teams in Alabama